Mike LaRoche (May 24, 1946 – July 30, 2020) was an American professional basketball player in the American Basketball Association, rostered briefly in the 1968–69 season with the then-Los Angeles Stars.

Early life 
LaRoche attended Fillmore High School, and in 2010 was inducted into the school's inaugural Hall of Fame.

College career 
Playing for Cal Poly, LaRoche was the CCAA's leading scorer in 1966–67, and earned all-conference status three consecutive times.

Professional basketball 
Los Angeles selected LaRoche with a pick in the additional rounds of the 1968 ABA Draft. Standing 6-foot-4, 200 pounds, LaRoche signed with the Stars in June 1968, for $12,000 with a signing bonus of $3,000, after scoring eight points each in two summer intrasquad games at the L.A. Sports Arena. Of the signing, L.A. coach Bill Sharman commented: "LaRoche showed us a lot during our rookie summer camp. He is a fine shooter, very aggressive and an excellent defensive player."

He was assigned uniform number 14, and netted 14, 26 and then 10 points in a trio of the club's preseason scrimmages.

While then rostered for the Stars' first two regular-season games, LaRoche did not see any floor time during either of the two games, and thereafter was released.

After basketball, he went on to a lengthy law career.

References

1946 births
2020 deaths
American men's basketball players
Cal Poly Mustangs men's basketball players
Los Angeles Stars players